Raymond Holman (17 September 1919 – 19 September 1989) was an Australian cricketer. He played in one first-class match for South Australia in 1940/41.

See also
 List of South Australian representative cricketers

References

External links
 

1919 births
1989 deaths
Australian cricketers
South Australia cricketers
Cricketers from Adelaide